The Filmfare Award for Best Story is given by Filmfare as part of its annual Filmfare Awards for Hindi films, to recognise a writer who wrote a film's story.

List of winners

1950s

 1955 Mukhram Sharma – Aulad
 1956 Rajinder Singh Bedi – Garam Coat
 Manoranjan Ghose – Jagriti
 Mukhram Sharma – Vachan
 1957 Amiya Chakrabarty – Seema
 1958 Akhtar Mirza – Naya Daur
 1959 Mukhram Sharma – Sadhna
 Mukhram Sharma – Talaaq
 Ritwik Ghatak – Madhumati

1960s

 1960 Subodh Ghosh – Sujata
 Dhruva Chatterjee – Chirag Kahan Roshni Kahan
 Mukhram Sharma – Dhool Ka Phool
 1961 Ruby Sen – Masoom
 Saghir Usmani – Chaudhvin Ka Chand
 Salil Chowdhury – Parakh
 1962 C. V. Sridhar – Nazrana
 C. J. Pavri – Kanoon
 Mohan Kumar – Aas Ka Panchhi
 1963 K.P. Kottarakara – Rakhi
 Bimal Mitra – Sahib Bibi Aur Ghulam
 Jawar N. Sitaraman – Main Chup Rahungi
 1964 Jarasandha – Bandini
 B.R. Films (Story Dept.) – Gumrah
 C. V. Sridhar – Dil Ek Mandir
 1965 Ban Bhatt – Dosti
 Inder Raj Anand – Sangam
Khwaja Ahmad Abbas - Shehar Aur Sapna
 1966 Akhtar Mirza – Waqt
 Gulshan Nanda – Kaajal
 Ramanand Sagar – Arzoo
 1967 R. K. Narayan – Guide
 Hrishikesh Mukherjee – Anupama
 Nihar Ranjan Gupta – Mamta
 1968 Manoj Kumar – Upkaar
 Ashapoorna Devi – Mehrban
 Protiva Bose – Aasra
 1969 Sachin Bhowmick – Brahmachari
 Gulshan Nanda – Neel Kamal
 Ramanand Sagar – Aankhen

1970s
 1970 Vasant Kanetkar – Aansoo Ban Gaye Phool
 Hrishikesh Mukherjee – Aashirwad
 Sachin Bhowmick – Aradhana
 1971 Chandrakant Kakodkar – Do Raaste
 Gulshan Nanda – Khilona
 Sachin Bhowmick – Pehchan
 1972 Hrishikesh Mukherjee – Anand
 Gulshan Nanda – Kati Patang
 Gulshan Nanda – Naya Zamana
 1973 Basu Bhattacharya – Anubhav
 Manoj Kumar – Shor
 1974 Salim–Javed – Zanjeer
 Gulzar – Koshish
 Khwaja Ahmad Abbas – Achanak
 Mulraj Rajda – Aaj Ki Taaza Khabar
 Shakti Samanta – Anuraag
 1975 Kaifi Azmi, Ismat Chughtai – Garm Hava
 Ashutosh Mukhopadhyay – Kora Kagaz
 Manoj Kumar – Roti Kapda Aur Makaan
 N. T. Rama Rao – Bidaai
 Shyam Benegal – Ankur
 1976 Salim–Javed – Deewaar
 Kamleshwar – Aandhi
 Salim–Javed – Sholay
 Shaktipada Rajguru – Amanush
 Vijay Tendulkar – Nishant
 1977 Balai Chand Mukhopadhyay – Arjun Pandit
 Ashapoorna Devi – Tapasya
 Gulshan Nanda – Mehbooba
 Kamleshwar – Mausam
 Pamela Chopra – Kabhi Kabhie
 1978 Sharat Chandra Chatterji – Swami
 Asrani – Chala Murari Hero Banne
 Bhusan Bangali – Kinara
 Raju Saigal – Doosra Aadmi
 Shanker Shesh – Gharaonda
 1979 Dinesh Thakur – Ghar
 Chandrakant Kakodkar – Main Tulsi Tere Aangan Ki
 Laxmikant Sharma – Muqaddar Ka Sikandar
 Salim–Javed – Trishul
 Samaresh Basu – Kitaab

1980s
 1980 Shanker Shesh – Dooriyaan
K. Viswanath – Sargam
Ruskin Bond – Junoon
 Sailesh Dey – Gol Maal
 Salim–Javed – Kaala Patthar
 1981 Vijay Tendulkar – Aakrosh
 D. N. Mukherjee – Khubsoorat
 Esmayeel Shroff – Thodisi Bewafaii
 Ram Kalkar – Aasha
 Shabd Kumar – Insaaf Ka Tarazu
 1982 Chetan Anand – Kudrat
 Jaywant Dalvi – Chakra
 K. Balachander – Ek Duuje Ke Liye
 Leela Phansalkar – Baseraa
 Shyam Benegal, Girish Karnad – Kalyug
 1983 Samaresh Basu – Namkeen
 Achla Nagar – Nikaah
 Kamna Chandra – Prem Rog
 Sagar Sarhadi – Bazaar
 Salim–Javed – Shakti
 1984 S. D. Panvalkar – Ardh Satya
 Balu Mahendra – Sadma
 Javed Akhtar – Betaab
 Mahesh Bhatt – Arth
 Mohan Kumar – Avtaar
 1985 Mahesh Bhatt – Saaransh
 Gyav Dev Agnihotri – Ghar Ek Mandir
 Javed Akhtar – Mashaal
 Shabd Kumar – Aaj Ki Awaaz
 Sudhir Mishra – Mohan Joshi Hazir Ho!
 1986 Aleem Masroor – Tawaif
 C. T. Khanolkar – Ankahee
 Javed Akhtar – Arjun
 K. K. Singh – Ram Teri Ganga Maili
 Mahesh Bhatt – Janam
 Rajan Roy – Saaheb
 1987 Not Awarded
 1988 Not Awarded
 1989 Subodh Ghosh – Ijaazat

1990s

 1990 K. Vishwanath – Eeshwar Aditya Bhattacharya – Raakh
 J. P. Dutta – Batwara
 Joy Augustine – Goonj
 1991 Rajkumar Santoshi – Ghayal 1992 Honey Irani – Lamhe Ramapada Chowdhury – Ek Doctor Ki Maut
 Sai Paranjpye – Disha
 Sujit Sen, Nana Patekar – Prahaar: The Final Attack
 1993 Not Awarded 1994 Sutanu Gupta – Damini – Lightning 1995 K.K. Singh – Krantiveer 1996 Ram Gopal Varma – Rangeela 1997 Gulzar – Maachis 1998 Kamal Haasan – Virasat 1999 Mahesh Bhatt – Zakhm2000s

 2000 Vinay Shukla – Godmother 2001 Honey Irani – Kya Kehna 2002 Ashutosh Gowariker – Lagaan 2003 Jaideep Sahni – Company 2004 Nagesh Kukunoor – 3 Deewarein 2005 Aditya Chopra – Veer-Zaara 2006 Sudhir Mishra, Ruchi Narain, Shiv Kumar Subramaniam – Hazaaron Khwaishein Aisi 2007 Rajkumar Hirani, Vidhu Vinod Chopra – Lage Raho Munna Bhai Jaideep Sahni – Khosla Ka Ghosla
 Kamlesh Pandey – Rang De Basanti
 Karan Johar - Kabhi Alvida Naa Kehna
 Kersi Khambatta – Being Cyrus
Mahesh Bhatt – Gangster
 2008 Amol Gupte – Taare Zameen Par Jaideep Sahni – Chak De! India
 Mani Ratnam – Guru
 Rahul Dholakia, David N. Donihue – Parzania
 Vibha Singh – Dharm2009 Abhishek Kapoor – Rock On!!Aseem Arora – Heroes
Dibakar Banerjee, Urmi Juvekar – Oye Lucky! Lucky Oye!
Neeraj Pandey – A Wednesday
Santosh Sivan – Tahaan

2010s2010 Abhijat Joshi, Rajkumar Hirani – 3 IdiotsAnurag Kashyap, Aparna Malhotra, Raj Singh Chaudhary, Sanjay Maurya – Gulaal
Imtiaz Ali – Love Aaj Kal
Jaideep Sahni – Rocket Singh: Salesman of the Year
Zoya Akhtar – Luck By Chance
 2011 Anurag Kashyap, Vikramaditya Motwane – Udaan 2012 Sanjay Chauhan – I Am Kalam Akshat Verma – Delhi Belly
 Amol Gupte – Stanley Ka Dabba
 Rajat Arora – The Dirty Picture
 Reema Kagti, Zoya Akhtar – Zindagi Na Milegi Dobara
 2013 Juhi Chaturvedi - Vicky Donor 2014 Subhash Kapoor - Jolly LLB 2015 Rajat Kapoor – Ankhon DekhiAnurag Kashyap - Ugly
Imtiaz Ali - Highway
 Nitin Kakkar - Filmistaan
Rajkumar Hirani and Abhijat Joshi - PK
 2016 V. Vijayendra Prasad – Bajrangi BhaijaanJuhi Chaturvedi - Piku
Olivia Stewart - Titli
R. Balki - Shamitabh
Sharadindu Bandyopadhyay - Detective Byomkesh Bakshy!
 2017 Shakun Batra, Ayesha Devitre Dhillon – Kapoor & Sons.
 2018 Amit V Masurkar - NewtonAmit Joshi – Trapped
Rahul Dahiya – G Kutta Se
Shanker Raman and Sourabh Ratnu – Gurgaon
Shubhashish Bhutiani – Mukti Bhawan
Suresh Triveni – Tumhari Sulu
 2019 Anubhav Sinha – Mulk Anudeep Singh – Mukkabaaz
 Raj and DK – Stree
 Sharat Katariya – Sui Dhaaga
 Akshat Ghildial, Shantanu Srivastava and Jyoti Kapoor – Badhaai Ho (Withdrawn)2020s

 2020 Anubhav Sinha, Gaurav Solanki - Article 15 Abhishek Chaubey, Sudip Sharma - Sonchiriya
 Jagan Shakti - Mission Mangal
 Nitesh Tiwari, Piyush Gupta and Nikhil Mehrotra - Chhichhore
 Vasan Bala - Mard Ko Dard Nahi Hota 
 Zoya Akhtar, Reema Kagti  - Gully Boy
 2021 Anubhav Sinha, Mrunmayee Lagoo Waikul - Thappad' Rohena Gera - Sir Hardik Mehta - Kaamyaab Rajesh Krishnan, Kapil Sawant - Lootcase Juhi Chaturvedi - Gulabo Sitabo 
 Shubham  - Eeb Allay Ooo!''

See also 
 Cinema of India

References

External links
Filmfare Awards Best Story
Filmfare Awards Best Short Films

Story